Kolenda or Kolendas is a surname. Notable people with the surname include:

Greg Kolenda, American football player
Havryil Kolenda (1606–1674), Ruthenian religious leader
Łukasz Kolenda (born 1999), Polish basketball player
Pavel Kolendas (born 1820), Russian painter